Gearhart can refer to:

Business
 Gearhart Industries, an oil well service company

People
 Bertrand W. Gearhart (1890-1955), American lawyer and politician
 Devon Gearhart (born 1995), American teen actor
 Frances Gearhart (1869–1959), American printmaker
 Gary Gearhart (1923– 2001), Major League Baseball outfielder
 G. David Gearhart (born 1952), fifth chancellor of the University of Arkansas
 May Gearhart (1872–1951), American printmaker
 Sally Miller Gearhart (born 1931), American teacher, feminist, science fiction writer, and political activist

Places
 Gearhart Mountain Wilderness, an area in south-central Oregon
 Gearhart, Oregon, a city in Clatsop County, Oregon